Melignomon is a genus of birds in the family Indicatoridae. 
It contains the following species:
 Yellow-footed honeyguide (Melignomon eisentrauti)
 Zenker's honeyguide (Melignomon zenkeri)

 
Indicatoridae
Bird genera
Taxonomy articles created by Polbot